Skippyjon Jones is a children's picture book series by Judith Byron Schachner. The first book was published in 2003 by Dutton Juvenile. The books are notable for their popularity amongst children, use of mock Spanish, and controversy over their representation of Latinos.

Summary 
The title character, Skippyjon Jones, is a Siamese cat with unusually large ears, an equally large head and an unusually small tail. Since he doesn't look like his mother and sisters, he thinks that he is a Chihuahua, although he DID once say he knows he’s a cat. He has a group of imaginary Chihuahua friends, Los Chimichangos. He lives with his mother Junebug, his three sisters Jezebel, Jillyboo, and Jujube. The stories follow Skippyjon Jones on his various adventures.

Books 
Skippyjon Jones is published under Penguin Random House within its Dutton Juvenile division.

Controversy
Several reviews criticize Skippyjon Jones’ depiction of Latinos and use of mock Spanish. Due to its stereotypes, the series is ranked 8 on the American Library Association's list of top challenged books for 2018. Amy Senta, an early childhood professor, described a moment when a Latino child remarked he thought the book was mocking him. Following this experience, she analyzed the books and summarized them as demeaning Mexicans through characterization, improper use of language, and the enforcement of a “white savior” modality. Particularly, the Spanish used is oftentimes incorrect and can mislead non-Spanish speakers into believing a word is Spanish due to the addition of Spanish articles and endings. Another analysis states Skippyjon Jones and his chihuahua friends are humanized and given traits symbolic of Latinos. Through this depiction and anthropomorphization, the characters are seen as substitutes for "racial and ethnic identities," a representation invoking "tokenism."

However, these critiques are criticized for advocating censorship of the books and projecting ideas of racism into a children’s series. There is discussion regarding the roles of these books in children's literature due to their wide success. This discourse focuses on their success commercially combined with the overarching criticisms of stereotyping. Although, Schachner defends her writing and claims the books are intended for education.

Reception

Reviews of the books are generally positive, highlighting the adventurous tales and descriptive language. One review notes that readers searching for true depictions of Latinos are best served elsewhere. In 2004, Skippyjon Jones won the first annual E. B. White Read Aloud Award, handed out by The Association of Booksellers for Children. Also, Skippyjon Jones has won several local children's book awards, including the New Hampshire State Library's 2005 Ladybug Picture Book Award, the 2005 Washington Children's Choice Picture Book Award, and the 2006 Colorado Council International Reading Association (CCIRA) Colorado Children's Book Award for Picture Book. Based on a 2007 online poll, the National Education Association listed Skippyjon Jones as one of its "Teachers' Top 100 Books for Children". A New York Times review said Skippyjon Jones is a fun, bilingual book similar to a Ulysses for kids.

Theatre Production 
Following commercial success, Skippyjon Jones and Skippyjon Jones: Snow What were both adapted into musical productions. In 2011 and 2014, Theatreworks USA put on productions of Skippyjon Jones at the Pittsburgh International Children's Theater and various other locations in Pittsburgh. The performances received good reviews, stating the show was enjoyable for all ages. In 2016, the H. Ric Luhrs Performing Arts Center in Shippensburg, PA hosted a production of Skippyjon Jones: Snow What that was commended for its set design and performance.

References

External links
Official Skippyjon Jones site
The E. B. White Read Aloud Awards

2003 children's books
American picture books
Books about cats
Books about dogs
Race-related controversies in literature
Ethnic humour
Stereotypes of Hispanic and Latino people